Dick Blanchfield (died 20 July 2019) was an Irish sportsperson.  He played hurling with his local club Lisdowney and was a member of the Kilkenny senior inter-county team in the 1960s.  With Kilkenny Blanchfield won an All-Ireland and Leinster titles.

References 

2019 deaths
Lisdowney hurlers
Kilkenny hurlers
All-Ireland Senior Hurling Championship winners
Year of birth missing
People from County Kilkenny